Chris van Heerden (born 19 June 1987) is a South African professional boxer and a former IBO welterweight champion.

Early life
Van Heerden grew up in Meyerton, Gauteng.

Professional career 
Van Heerden started his professional career in 2006. He quickly emerged as a top fighter in the African continent, which he subsequently proved by snapping South African and ABU welterweight titles. However, in 2010 he suffered his first loss in the professional ring to Serbian Ivica Stevanovic for IBF Inter-Continental light middleweight title. This fight, though, did not stop him from rise to success. In 2009 he prevailed over fellow South African Kaizer Mabuza and gained IBO welterweight belt. He managed to defend his belt twice, against Sebastián Andrés Luján and Matthew Hatton.

In Winter 2013 van Heerden decided to relocate to the United States. The move meant that Van Heerden had been forced to relinquish his status as the International Boxing Organisation's champion but it was a move that he considered to pave the way to higher honours in future.

Van Heerden vs. Spence Jr 
On 11 September 2015, van Heerden faced rising prospect Errol Spence Jr. Despite taunting Spence Jr numerous times throughout the fight, van Heerden was dominated by Spence Jr and dropped twice before the referee had seen enough and decided to stop the fight in round eight.

Van Heerden vs. Ennis 
On 19 December 2020, van Heerden fought Jaron Ennis. Ennis was ranked #7 by the WBO, #10 by the IBF and #12 by the WBC at welterweight. After a clash of heads in the first round, van Heerden suffered a severe cut on his forehead which prompted the referee to stop the fight early, ending the fight with a no-decision outcome.

Van Heerden vs. Benn 
On April, 16th 2022, Van Heerden challenged undefeated prospect Conor Benn for the WBA Continental Welterweight title. He lost by 2nd-round TKO after being dominated and got brutally knocked down in Round 2, where the referee stopped it.

Personal life 
Van Heerden currently resides in Los Angeles, California.

Professional boxing record

|-  style="text-align:center; background:#e3e3e3;"
|  style="border-style:none none solid solid; "|Res.
|  style="border-style:none none solid solid; "|Record
|  style="border-style:none none solid solid; "|Opponent
|  style="border-style:none none solid solid; "|Type
|  style="border-style:none none solid solid; "|Round
|  style="border-style:none none solid solid; "|Date
|  style="border-style:none none solid solid; "|Location
|  style="border-style:none none solid solid; "|Notes
|align=left|
|- align=center
|Loss
|28–3–1
|align=left| Conor Benn
|
|
|
|align=left|
|- align=center
|style="background:#DDD"|
|28–2–1
|align=left| Jaron Ennis
|
|
|
|align=left|
|align=left|
|- align=center
|Win
|28–2–1
|align=left| Aslanbek Kozaev
|
|
|
|align=left|
|align=left|
|- align=center
|Win
|27–2–1
|align=left| Mahonri Montes
|
|
|
|align=left|
|align=left|
|- align=center
|Win
|26–2–1
|align=left| Timo Schwarzkopf
|
|
|
|align=left|
|align=left|
|- align=center
|Win
|25–2–1
|align=left| Sacky Shikukutu
|
|
|
|align=left|
|align=left|
|- align=center
|Win
|24–2–1
|align=left| Steve Clagget
|
|
|
|align=left|
|align=left|
|- align=center
|Loss
|23–2–1
|align=left| Errol Spence Jr.
|
|
|
|align=left|
|align=left|
|- align=center
|Win
|23–1–1
|align=left| Raymon Ayala
|||
|
|align=left|
|align=left|
|- align=center
|Win
|22–1–1
|align=left| Cecil McCalla
|||
|
|align=left|
|align=left|
|- align=center
|Win
|21–1–1
|align=left| Ray Narh
|||
|
|align=left|
|align=left|
|- align=center
|Win
|20–1–1
|align=left| Cosme Rivera
|||
|
|align=left|
|align=left|
|- align=center
|Win
|19–1–1
|align=left| Matthew Hatton
|||
|
|align=left|
|align=left|
|- align=center
|Win
|18–1–1
|align=left| Sebastián Andrés Luján
|||
|
|align=left|
|align=left|
|- align=center
|Win
|17–1–1
|align=left| Kaizer Mabuza
|||
|
|align=left|
|align=left|
|- align=center
|Win
|16–1–1
|align=left| Bongani Mwelase
|||
|
|align=left|
|align=left|
|- align=center
|Win
|15–1–1
|align=left| Boitshepo Mandawe
|||
|
|align=left|
|align=left|
|- align=center
|Loss
|14–1–1
|align=left| Nikola Stevanović
|||
|
|align=left|
|align=left|
|- align=center
|Win
|14–0–1
|align=left| Venance Mponji
|||
|
|align=left|
|align=left|
|- align=center
|Win
|13–0–1
|align=left| Boitshepo Mandawe
|||
|
|align=left|
|align=left|
|- align=center
|Win
|12–0–1
|align=left| Welcome Ntshingila
|||
|
|align=left|
|align=left|
|- align=center
|Win
|11–0–1
|align=left| Page Tshesane
|||
|
|align=left|
|align=left|
|- align=center
|Win
|10–0–1
|align=left| Hassan Saku
|||
|
|align=left|
|align=left|
|- align=center
|Win
|9–0–1
|align=left| Msizi Qwabe
|||
|
|align=left|
|align=left|
|- align=center
|style="background:#abcdef;"|Draw
|8–0–1
|align=left| Page Tshesane
|||
|
|align=left|
|align=left|
|- align=center
|Win
|8–0
|align=left| Mpho Tshiambara
|||
|
|align=left|
|align=left|
|- align=center
|Win
|7–0
|align=left| George Mapalakane
|||
|
|align=left|
|align=left|
|- align=center
|Win
|6–0
|align=left| Luntu Kosana
|||
|
|align=left|
|align=left|
|- align=center
|Win
|5–0
|align=left| John Mokgotsa
|||
|
|align=left|
|align=left|
|- align=center
|Win
|4–0
|align=left| Moses Mbowane
|||
|
|align=left|
|align=left|
|- align=center
|Win
|3–0
|align=left| Keketso Mathaba
|||
|
|align=left|
|align=left|
|- align=center
|Win
|2–0
|align=left| Rodney Nepfumbada
|||
|
|align=left|
|align=left|
|- align=center
|Win
|1–0
|align=left| Lucky Mavimbela
|||
|
|align=left|
|align=left|

References

External links

 Chris van Heerden – Profile, News Archive & Current Rankings at Box.Live

1987 births
Living people
African Boxing Union champions
Boxers from Johannesburg
People from Midvaal Local Municipality
South African male boxers
Southpaw boxers
Welterweight boxers
White South African people